Ángel Nieves Díaz (31 August 1951 – 13 December 2006) was a Puerto Rican convict and a suspected serial killer who was executed by lethal injection by Florida. Nieves, who had escaped from a prison in Puerto Rico while serving time for murder, was convicted of shooting and killing the manager of a strip club in Florida in 1979. He maintained his innocence until his death.

Early life 
Nieves was born in Puerto Rico, and became involved in the world of crime and drugs, going by the nickname Papo la Muerte, which roughly translates to "Daddy Death" or "Death Daddy". He was also a suspected leader of the Boricua Popular Army, also known as the Los Macheteros.

Nieves married in high school and dropped out in his third year. When he was 17, he was arrested for possessing heroin. When Nieves was 24, he shot and wounded a police officer during an armed robbery. He was sentenced to 5 to 8 years in prison.

Crimes 
In July 1978, Nieves killed the director of a drug rehabilitation center, stabbing him 19 times while he was sleeping. He was found guilty of second degree murder and sentenced to 10 to 15 years in prison. In 1979, Nieves escaped from the Río Piedras State Penitentiary, nearly beating a guard to death in the process. He then fled to Florida.

On 29 December 1979, Nieves and two friends, Angel Toro and another man who was never caught, robbed the Velvet Swing Lounge, a strip club in Florida. During the robbery, Joseph Nagy, the manager, was shot to death. There were no eyewitnesses because most of the employees and patrons were locked in a public restroom.

Police also suspect Nieves and Toro of committing another murder in Miami.

In February 1981, Nieves was arrested on unrelated assault and firearms charges. He gave them a fake name, Emilio Baez, and posted bail. Before police discovered his identity, Nieves jumped bail and fled north to Connecticut. He was later arrested on federal firearm charges in Middletown, Connecticut. While awaiting trial, Nieves was sent to Hartford Correctional Center. In August 1981, he and three other inmates escaped by holding one guard at knifepoint and beating another guard. He was convicted in federal court of illegally possessing a firearm and second degree kidnapping in state court. Nieves was also convicted of a state firearm charge, after officials found a loaded 38-caliber Derringer revolver in his cell. His federal conviction was later overturned under a now closed loophole due to Puerto Rico not being a state.

Nieves and Toro, the latter now serving life without parole for murdering a woman in Massachusetts, were charged with killing Nagy in 1983, after Nieves' girlfriend at the time told police that Nieves was involved. Police found Nieves' fingerprint on a matchbook left at the scene. In 1986, Diaz was found guilty of first degree murder. During his trial, he threatened witnesses, fired his lawyer, and chose to represent himself. Diaz claimed that Toro had committed the murder. The jury sentenced him to death by an 8–4 vote.

The testimony of a fellow inmate of Dade County, Ralph Gajus, who was serving a 20-year sentence for second degree murder, was also crucial in Nieves' conviction and sentence. In 1984, Gajus testified that Nieves had confessed in his cell that he had shot Nagy. Although Nieves spoke English poorly and Gajus understood no Spanish, the two communicated with hand signals. Nieves' eventual conviction was in fact largely dependent on cellmate Gajus' testimony.

Toro pleaded guilty to second degree murder and received a life sentence.

Execution 
In 2006, Nieves' last appeal was denied. As the date of the execution came closer, the case was again brought to the public attention. On 28 November 2006, the Governor of Puerto Rico, Aníbal Acevedo Vilá, asked the Governor of Florida, Jeb Bush, for clemency in the case. Governor Vilá voiced concerns about the fairness of Nieves' trial, the recanted testimony of Gajus, and Toro's life sentence.

On 13 December 2006, Nieves was executed by lethal injection at the Florida State Prison in Raiford. He never ordered a last meal, but was served a prison menu of shredded turkey with taco seasoning, shredded cheese, rice, pinto beans, tortilla shells, apple crisp, and iced tea, which he turned down. His final statement was: "The state of Florida is killing an innocent person. The state of Florida is committing a crime because I am innocent. The death penalty is not only a form of vengeance, but also a cowardly act by humans. I'm sorry for what is happening to me and my family who have been put through this." A great amount of controversy surrounded the execution because, contrary to the usual practices, Nieves needed an additional dose of drugs to be executed.  The whole process took approximately 34 minutes as opposed to the usual 7.5 minutes. The family declared the procedure a botched execution.

Gretl Plessinger, spokeswoman for the Florida Department of Corrections, said that Nieves Díaz did not feel any pain and that a liver condition was the cause of the delay, but the family then denied that Nieves Díaz suffered any such condition. A further investigation concluded that there was negligence in the placement of the needles in Nieves Díaz's arms, whereby the needle would have penetrated entirely through the vein, denying the drugs direct entry into the bloodstream and thereby preventing the drugs from directly reaching desired target sites such as the brain and diaphragm. Rather, the drugs were injected into soft tissue after the needle entered and immediately exited the vein, thereby greatly lengthening the time before death. As a result of this, then governor Jeb Bush postponed all pending executions until further notice. However, on 18 July 2007, the new governor, Charlie Crist, lifted the ban by signing a death warrant, authorizing the execution of Mark Dean Schwab.

In 2014, The New Republic published photographs of the botched execution, showing discoloration on the prisoner's arms.

See also
Capital punishment in Florida
Capital punishment in the United States
List of people executed in Florida
List of people executed in the United States in 2006
Botched executions:
Clayton Lockett
Doyle Hamm

References

1951 births
2006 deaths
21st-century executions by Florida
21st-century executions of American people
1979 murders in the United States
American kidnappers
American robbers
Executed Puerto Rican people
People convicted of murder by Florida
People convicted of murder by Puerto Rico
People executed by Florida by lethal injection
People executed for murder
Puerto Rican people convicted of murder
Suspected serial killers